Äijänen is a Finnish surname. Notable people with the surname include:

 Jami Äijänen (born 1996), Finnish squash player
 Miko Äijänen (born 1997), Finnish squash player, brother of Jami

Finnish-language surnames